St. John Vianney High School is a private coeducational Roman Catholic four-year high school, serving students in grades nine through twelve. The school is located on a  campus in Holmdel Township, in Monmouth County, New Jersey, and is operated under the supervision of the Roman Catholic Diocese of Trenton. The school is accredited by AdvancED.

As of the 2017–18 school year, the school had an enrollment of 979 students and 64.4 classroom teachers (on an FTE basis), for a student–teacher ratio of 15.2:1. The school's student body was 82.8% (811) White, 5.0% (49) Hispanic, 4.9% (48) Asian, 3.7% (36) Black and 3.3% (32) two or more races.

The school motto is "Knowledge – Commitment – Involvement". The St. John Vianney High School Lancers wear the school colors of Gold, White and Black.

Education
Saint John Vianney High School offers its students block scheduling. Block schedules enrolls students in four courses each semester that meet every day for 90 days. Each of the four blocks lasts 77 minutes. All students and staff have the same lunch/activity period in the middle of the day.

Athletics
The St. John Vianney High School Lancers compete in Division B North of the Shore Conference, an athletic conference comprised of private and public high schools in Monmouth and Ocean counties along the Jersey Shore. The league operates under the jurisdiction of the New Jersey State Interscholastic Athletic Association (NJSIAA). With 718 students in grades 10-12, the school was classified by the NJSIAA for the 2019–20 school year as Non-Public A for most athletic competition purposes, which included schools with an enrollment of 381 to 1,454 students in that grade range (equivalent to Group II for public schools). The school was classified by the NJSIAA as Non-Public Group III for football for 2018–2020.

The school participates as the host school / lead agency for joint cooperative ice hockey team with Ranney School. The co-op program operates under an agreement scheduled to expire at the end of the 2023–24 school year.

The boys' cross country team won the Non-Public Group B state championship in 1973.

The girls' cross country team won the Group II state championship in 1978 and 1981, and won the Non-Public A title in 1983.

The 1978 boys' basketball team came into the playoffs with a 12-12 record and went on to win the Non-Public Group B state title, defeating runner-up Our Lady of the Valley High School by a score of 65-58 in the tournament final.

The football team won the Non-Public A South state sectional championship in 1980.

The baseball team won the Non-Public Group A state championship in 1981 (defeating Saint Joseph of the Palisades High School in the tournament final) and 2014 (vs. St. Joseph Regional High School of Montvale).
In 2014, St. John Vianney's baseball team defeated Gloucester Catholic High School by a score of 3-2 to win the NJSIAA Non-Public South A sectional final and won the state Non-Public A title as an 8 seed in their own section when they defeated St. Joseph Regional High School, the representative from North A by a score of 3-1 in the state championship gane.

The girls' tennis team won the Non-Public A state championship in 1988, defeating runner-up Academy of the Holy Angels in the final match of the tournament.

The girl' basketball team won the Non-Public Group A state sectional championship in 1990 (defeating Academy of the Holy Angels in the tournament final), 1991 (vs. Immaculata High School), 1992 (vs. Queen of Peace High School), 1993 (vs. Paramus Catholic High School). 1994 (vs. Immaculate), 1997 (vs. Paramus Catholic), 1998 (vs. Pope John XXIII High School), 1999 (vs. Immaculate Heart Academy), 2003 (vs. Immaculata), 2005 (vs. Roselle Catholic High School), 2008 (vs. Morris Catholic High School), 2009 (vs. Immaculate Heart), 2010 (vs. Immaculate Heart), 2011 (vs. DePaul Catholic High School), 2015 (vs. Immaculate Heart) and 2016 (vs. Immaculate Heart) and won the Non-Public B state title in 1995 (vs. Mount Saint Dominic Academy). In 2020, the school was declared as Non-Public South A sectional champion, after the finals were cancelled due to COVID-19. The 16 state group titles are the most of any school in the state. The team has won the Tournament of Champions in 1991 (vs. second-seeded Ridgewood High School in the finals), 1993 (vs. fourth-seeded West Side High School), 1995 (vs. second-seeded West Milford High School), 1997 (vs. second-seeded Piscataway High School), 1999 (vs. second-seeded West Morris Mendham High School), 2009 (vs. fourth-seeded Colts Neck High School) and 2016 (vs. second-seeded Manasquan High School). The program's seven titles in the Tournament of Champions are the most of any school. In 2005, the girls' basketball team won the Non-Public, South A title over Red Bank Catholic High School, 51-39. The team moved on to the group championship, defeating Roselle Catholic High School to earn the state group championship. The team advanced to the finals of the 2005 girls' basketball Tournament of Champions, falling to Woodrow Wilson High School, 64-45. In 2008, the girls' basketball team won the Parochial A state championship and moved on to lose in the Tournament of Champions semifinals to Malcolm X Shabazz High School by a score of 75-35. In 2009, the Lady Lancer basketball team, led by Coach Dawn Karpell, won the Non-Public A title with a 77-46 win against Immaculate Heart in the finals at the Ritacco Center in Toms River and was ranked #1 in the New York Metropolitan region by the MSG network after winning their record sixth Tournament of Champions title, defeating Colts Neck by a score of 56-44 in the tournament final. The team won the 2010 NJSIAA Non-Public A state title and finished the season as the #2 ranked team in the state by The Star-Ledger after a 53-39 win over Immaculate Heart that marked the team's 13th victory in a Non-Public A final with no defeats. The Lady Lancers lost to Neptune High School by a score of 67-48 in the finals of the Tournament of Champions at the Izod Center.

The wrestling team won the Non-Public Group B South state sectional championship in 1995 and 1996, and won the Non-Public B state championship in 1995.

The 2000 girls' soccer team won the Parochial South A state championship, defeating Holy Cross High School 4-0 in the tournament final.

The softball team won the Non-Public Group A state championship in 2001 (against runner-up Paramus Catholic High School in the finals of the tournament), 2002 (vs. Immaculate Heart Academy), 2004 (vs. Mount Saint Dominic Academy), 2010 (vs. Paramus Catholic High School), 2011 (vs. Immaculate Heart), 2013 (vs. Immaculate Heart) and 2018 (vs. Mount Saint Dominic). The six state group titles are ranked seventh-most in the state. The 2001 team won the program's first state championship, winning the Parochial A title with a 2-1 defeat of Paramus Catholic. The team won the 2002 Parochial South A sectional championship with a 3-2 win over Red Bank Catholic High School. The 2004 team repeated as sectional champion, with a 5-0 shutout of Red Bank Catholic High School and moved on to win the Group A state championship with a 1-0 win over Mount Saint Dominic Academy, the lone run coming in the bottom of the seventh due to an error on a bunt that allowed a runner to score from second base. The 2004 team finished the season with a perfect 33-0 record, setting the state mark for the number of wins in a season by a girls' softball team, and gave the Lady Lancers three state titles in four years, the only exception being an extra innings loss in the 2003 tournament final to Immaculate Heart Academy. The Lady Lancer softball team, led by Coach Kim Lombardi, won the 2010 NJSIAA Non-Public A state title with a 4-1 victory over Paramus Catholic High School, the program's fourth state title and its first since 2004, finishing the season as the #2 ranked team in the state by The Star-Ledger. NJ.com / The Star-Ledger ranked St. John Vianney as their number-one softball team in the state in 2002, 2004, 2011 and 2013.

The ice hockey team won the Handchen Cup in 2013, 2018 and 2019.

The girls' bowling team was the Group I state championship in 2019.

The cheerleading team won the NJCDCA Non-Public state championship title in 2017.

Popular culture
Nine girls from this school were featured on an episode of Project Runway in 2008, in which each designer was asked to create a modern prom dress for each girl.

Notable alumni

 Anthony Brown, American football quarterback for the Oregon Ducks.
 Robert D. Clifton (born 1968), politician who has represented the 12th Legislative District in the New Jersey General Assembly since 2012..
 Sydney Cummings (born 1999), footballer who plays as a defender for the Brown Bears and the Guyana women's national team.
 Pamela Day, contestant on the second season of The Apprentice.
 Terry Deitz (born 1959), third-place finisher on Survivor: Panama.
 Jim Hunter (born c. 1959, class of 1977), sports announcer, currently with the Baltimore Orioles baseball team.
 Ishmael Hyman (born 1995), American football wide receiver for the Tampa Bay Buccaneers of the NFL.
 Evan Louro (born 1996), soccer player who plays as a goalkeeper for the New York Red Bulls in Major League Soccer.
 Christian Miele (born 1981), politician who has been a member of the Maryland House of Delegates since 2015.
 Frankie Montecalvo (born 1990, class of 2009), racecar driver in the WeatherTech SportsCar Championship, 2015 Pirelli World Challenge GTA Driver’s Champion.
 Jodi Lyn O'Keefe (born 1978), actress.
 Jerry Recco (born 1974), sports radio personality, who is a morning anchor on the Boomer and Gio program on sports radio station WFAN in New York City.
 Anthony Stolarz (born 1994), professional ice hockey goaltender for the Anaheim Ducks of the National Hockey League.

Notable faculty
 Monica Aksamit (born 1990), fencing coach who represented her country at the 2016 Summer Olympics where she earned a bronze medal in the Women's Saber Team event.

References

External links
St. John Vianney High School website
 Data for St. John Vianney High School, National Center for Education Statistics

1969 establishments in New Jersey
Educational institutions established in 1969
Private high schools in Monmouth County, New Jersey
Catholic secondary schools in New Jersey
Holmdel Township, New Jersey